Ramone Johnson (born October 10, 1982), better known by his stage name Cashis (stylized as Ca$his), is an American rapper  who was born and raised in Chicago, but moved to Irvine, California. He was most notably featured on the Shady Records album Eminem Presents: The Re-Up with Eminem and the record label, and released The County Hound EP in 2007. The County Hound EP sold 6,700 copies in its first week and debuted on the US Billboard 200 at number 106. He's best known for appearing on Eminem's song, "You Don't Know", featuring 50 Cent and Lloyd Banks.

In August 2011 on his mixtape Rooftop Series Vol.1, in the intro, Cashis revealed that he was leaving Shady Records, but is remaining with Bogish Brand Entertainment. After many delays, his solo debut album, The Art of Dying, was released independently on October 30, 2012, but failed to chart. On October 15, 2013, he released his second studio album The County Hound 2, which contained significant production from Eminem and was supported by five retail singles.

Musical career

1997–2006: Beginnings and signing to Shady Records 
Cashis first got into rapping by freestyling with his cousin at the early age of 12. At the age of 14, he went to the studio for the first time and professionally recorded his first song. Around age 17, he got serious about rapping and would go around the Los Angeles and Orange County area participating in rap battles under the name "Lil Ramone".

By 2004, Cashis was regarded as the "rap king of Orange County" and attracted the attention of Shady Records A&R, Dart Parker, who signed him after hearing his mixtape, Stars With Stripes. Cashis's introduction to the masses, however, wouldn't come until 2006 when he appeared alongside Eminem, 50 Cent and Lloyd Banks on "You Don't Know" the first single from the platinum-selling Shady Records compilation, Eminem Presents: The Re-Up, performing solo on the songs "Everything Is Shady" and "Talkin' All That". His solo track "Talkin' All That" was praised by Complex as an album standout.

2007–2012: The County Hound EP and The Art of Dying 
His first solo release on Shady Records was the successful eight track EP, The County Hound EP, on May 22, 2007. The County Hound EP debuted at number 106 on the US Billboard 200 and 37 on the Top R&B/Hip-Hop Albums chart. The album was primarily produced by Eminem, who was also the only featured artist on the project. The EP was met with mixed reviews upon its release from music critics. Some critics praised it as a solid introduction to Cashis, however others put down the gangster themes of the album's tracks. Upon its release he announced that his debut studio album would be titled, Loose Cannon and feature production from Eminem, Sha Money XL, Dr. Dre, and The Alchemist. At the time he set a release period for September or October 2007 for the project.

In 2009, Cashis promised he would have an album in stores by September. However the album was pushed back, allegedly due to projects from Eminem and 50 Cent. He would wait to release his album and then request his release from Shady Records which was not finalized until 2012. However he still remains contracted to them as a songwriter. In promotion of his debut LP Cashis released the Church on the Move mixtape. His debut full-length album titled The Art of Dying was released independently on October 30, 2012, with features coming from Rick Ross, Game, K-Young and Royce da 5'9" among others. Eminem also produced one song on the album titled as "You Think That I'm Crazy". Neither the album nor any of the songs on it charted in the United States.

2012–2014: The County Hound 2 and Euthanasia 

Just prior to the release of The Art of Dying, Cashis revealed he had begun to work on his second studio album, which he claimed was 65% done in September 2012. He also revealed that it would feature production from Jake One and Eminem, also projecting a May 2013 release. However, the release of the album did not occur when projected. On December 25, 2012, Cashis released another mixtape titled Loose Cannon which was previously going to be the title of his third studio album. On April 30, 2013, Cashis released the first single from his newly titled second studio album The County Hound 2, titled "Layin in the Cut" which was produced by Eminem and Rikanatti. The music video for the song was released on August 8, 2013, which also featured a preview of the music video for "Look At Me". The second single from the album titled, "Mind on My Money (Money on My Mind)" was released to iTunes on May 16, 2013. The song features rappers Kuniva from D12, Obie Trice and Dirty Mouth.

On July 1, 2013, Cashis released the third single from The County Hound 2, "Imma Hustla" featuring Crooked I and Sullee J. In July 2013, Ca$his announced that he was currently also working on his next mixtape The Loose Cannon 2 which will contain mostly freestyles. Then on August 19, 2013, he released the fourth single from The Country Hound 2, titled "Look at Me" featuring King Los, K Young, and B. Todd. On September 28, 2013, Cashis revealed the cover art and track list to the album, also announcing a release date of October 15, 2013. He also revealed unannounced guest appearances on the album to come from Boaz, and Demrick among others, with the album's production to be primarily handled by frequent collaborator Rikanatti, with Eminem also producing four tracks on the album.

In October 2013, leading up to the release of The County Hound 2, Cashis revealed that he had already recorded five or six records for his third studio album. Then on April 1, 2014, Cashis released "I'ma Ride" featuring Problem as the first single from the album. The album's second single titled "Bird Call", was released on May 6, 2014. Then on May 16, 2014, Cashis announced that the album, titled Euthanasia would be released on July 1, 2014. Its third single "100 Proof" featuring Roccett was released on May 28, 2014.

2015–present: I'm Getten Mine & County Hound 3 

In early January 2015, Cashis released the cover art for his long-awaited I'm Getten Mine mixtape, which was released a few days later for purchase on iTunes. On April 7, 2015, Cashis released his fourth studio album, The County Hound 3. Three singles were released in promotion of the album. The lead single "A-Rod" features Emilio Rojas. The second single "Work" features Young Buck, Project Pat & Sullee J. The third single released was "Kingpin" featuring Young Buck, Arez Cobain & June B. The County Hound 3 did not have any chart success. Cashis released CH4 in 2019

Discography

Studio albums

Compilation albums

EPs

Mixtapes
2006: Bogish Boy Vol. 1
2007: Bogish Boy Vol. 2
2008: The Leak
2008: Bogish Boy 300
2008: All Eyez on Me
2008: Blacc Jesus
2008: Global Warning 3
2008: Homeland Security (with Young De; hosted by DJ Whoo Kid)
2008: Loose Cannon
2008: Loose Cannon: The Cut Off
2008: Bogish Boy Vol. 4: Incase You Forgot
2009: The Leak Vol.2: Get Ready
2009: Bogish Boy Vol.5: Euthanasia
2010: The Re-Introduction
2011: The Vault
2011: Rooftop Series Vol.1
2012: Church on the Move
2012: Loose Cannon (Hosted by DJ Far)
2014: OG & Green Tea
2015: I'm Getten Mine
2016: The Cook Up
2016: The Cook Up 2
2017: Westbrook MVP
2017: Before 1 of 1
2017: Love Life Loyalty
2017: The Best Now
2017: Og & Green Tea 2
2020: OG & Green Tea
2020: Bogish
2020: Og 3
2021: OG & Green Tea 4
2021: Tlrnl
2022: BBG Radio vol. 2

Collaborative albums
2020: Tha Roll Up (with The Roll Up Clique)

Singles

Guest appearances

References

External links

African-American male rappers
American male rappers
Living people
Rappers from Chicago
1982 births
Midwest hip hop albums
Gangsta rappers
21st-century American rappers
21st-century American male musicians
21st-century African-American musicians
20th-century African-American people